Memnon, Scott Oden's second novel, tells the story of Memnon of Rhodes and his role in opposing Alexander the Great's conquest of Persia. This novel was first published on August 1, 2006, by Medallion Press.

References

2006 novels
Historical novels
Novels set in ancient Greece